"Back Up" is a song by American rapper Pitbull. It was released on December 22, 2004 as the third single from Pitbull's first studio album M.I.A.M.I.. The song was produced by DEL and the Díaz Brothers.

Track listing
"Back Up" (album version) – 3:38

Charts

Release history

References

2004 singles
2004 songs
Pitbull (rapper) songs
TVT Records singles
Songs written by Pitbull (rapper)